Dear U is a South Korean software development company under SM Studios, a wholly-owned subsidiary of SM Entertainment. The company was formerly called Everysing and was established in July 2017. It merged with Brinicle as it emphasized the union of information technology and entertainment business. It specializes in hosting multimedia content and artist-to-fan communications for artists and offers products and services including Everysing, Lysn, and Bubble.

History

2017–2020: Establishment and merger 
In July 2017, Dear U was established under the name of Everysing, which was founded by SM Entertainment with an investment of 6 billion won. In September 2018, Avex invested 5 billion won on the company with a capital increase of 500 million won. On January 1, 2019, the company merged with Brinicle, whose main business is software development and supply. After the merger, it provided a fan community platform, Bubble, as its main service. The flagship service of Dear U, Bubble, came from noting SM's experience in managing fan clubs and Brinicle's ability to develop messenger services. Lee Soo-man entrusted the chief executive officer position of the company to Ahn Jong-oh, who was also the CEO of Brinicle. Additionally, Lee has increased the related manpower pool while emphasizing the combination of information technology and entertainment business.

2021–present: Restructuring and stock acquisition 

On March 16, 2021, Dear U announced that they have raised the annual salary of all its employees by 15 million won. The company raised its annual salary to secure high-quality manpower to develop Bubble and Lysn applications. Lee Hak-hee, the chief operating officer of the company stated that Dear U is "paying attention" in "securing competitiveness" through "excellent" human resources. Through a public announcement on April 5, SM Entertainment established a wholly-owned subsidiary to promote the restructuring of group affiliates and to improve business structure. It was reported that SM would invest in SM Studios as it established a new corporation with all shares of SM Culture & Contents, KeyEast, SM Life Design Group, Dear U, and Mystic Story, on which it seeks to streamline group management through a responsible management system as it plans to focus more on the music business.

On June 4, 2021, SM reported that JYP Entertainment had acquired a 23.3% stake in Dear U as it began to expand its influence in the platform business. JYP announced the acquisition of an additional 14.1% of the old common stock of the company owned by SM Studios. Previously, on May 26, JYP had an acquisition of 1,682,000 shares of the company's old common stock. It had a stake of 9.1%, at about 8.4 billion won, and the final number of shares acquired was 4,285,192 shares with a 23.3% stake, and the investment amount was about 21.4 billion won. Its goal is to grow Dear U Bubble into a competitive mobile platform in the global market, noting the "synergy" between the two companies with global networks.

Previously, the entertainment industry and investment banking industry reported that Dear U is currently undergoing due diligence to apply for a preliminary examination for listing on the Korea Exchange. On June 11, 2021, the company submitted a preliminary review request for KOSDAQ listing to the Korea Exchange and started the initial public offering (IPO) process. It aims to be listed in the second half of this year in order to establish itself as a leading company in the global market, and the listing organizer is Korea Investment & Securities. Through the IPO, the company is planning to increase its "corporate awareness" and invest in developing a global message platform that will provide various services such as entering overseas markets and expanding platforms such as metaverse. It listed about 16,812,769 shares, of which near 20% will be put up for public offering.

Products and services

Lysn and Bubble service 

Dear U's core business, Dear U Bubble, is a service platform that receives personal messages written by artists. It can be downloaded from application markets and purchase it as a regular subscription for 4,500 won per month. Starting with SM Entertainment, Dear U Bubble, which was launched in February 2020, has signed contracts with a total of 25 local entertainment companies, including JYP Entertainment, FNC Entertainment, Jellyfish Entertainment, WM Entertainment, Brand New Music, Play M Entertainment, Top Media, RBW and Mystic Story, and is currently with a total of 39 groups and 21 solo artists, with a total of 247 artists. It was reported that the service has a "steady increase" in the number of subscribers, with the current share of global users reaching 70%. In the future, it plans to recruit not only Korean artists, but also American and Japanese artists as it plans on continuing to expand various additional services in order to strengthen its position as a "global platform".

Notes

References

External links 
 Official website

SM Entertainment subsidiaries
Social media companies
South Korean companies established in 2017
Software companies established in 2017
Software companies of South Korea
Companies listed on KOSDAQ
2021 initial public offerings